Genista monspessulana, commonly known as French broom, Montpellier broom, or Cape broom (Australia), is a woody leguminous perennial shrub. The yellow-flowering bush is native to the Mediterranean region, and while it may still be commonly sold in some garden stores, it is considered an invasive plant in most places where it has been introduced. It is a noxious weed on the western coast of the US and in parts of Australia.

Description

The stems are not ridged or green. The flowers are yellow, grouped 3–9 together in short racemes. Like other legumes, it develops its seeds within a pod. They burst open with force, dispersing the seeds several metres. One mature plant can produce 10,000 seeds per season. The generous seed production and the plant's ability to re-sprout after cutting or burning help it to invade new habitat vigorously when introduced.

It is related to the common broom and Spanish broom.

Distribution and habitat
G. monspessulana and related plants are common in European shrublands. French broom was originally distributed throughout Mediterranean Europe and northwest Africa, the Azores, and the Canary Islands. Due to its lower tolerance for frost than other broom species, it is common in warmer, lower elevation areas. It is found on coastal strips and in sunny inland areas, and does best with plentiful rainfall and sandy soils.

Ecology
When introduced to a new area, French broom can become an invasive plant. Its reproductive vigour and preference for Mediterranean climates make it a very successful species in California and the Pacific Northwest, where it is considered a severe noxious weed, covering over 40 kilohectares. It is even more widespread in Australia, where it covers 600,000 hectares and is also considered a noxious weed.

The plant often outcompetes native vegetation, forming dense fields where other species are almost completely crowded out. Stands of French broom can be so thick that they make meadows and pastures useless for wild and domestic animals. It can also shade out tree seedlings in reforested areas and tends to catch fire.

Toxicity

The leaves and seeds contain alkaloids which are poisonous to many large domestic animals.

See also
Broom (shrub)

References

External links

French Broom Information Page 
French Broom Webpage from the Calflora.org website; the webpage gives links to additional photos. Retrieved May 17, 2007.
Genista monspessulans (French Broom), from The Global Invasive Species Initiative website; the webpage has links to several photographs. Retrieved May 19, 2007.

monspessulana
Flora of Western Asia
Flora of Europe
Flora of Africa
Matorral shrubland
Plants described in 1753
Taxa named by Carl Linnaeus